Aurèle Florian Amenda (born 31 July 2003) is a Swiss footballer who currently plays as a defender for Swiss side BSC Young Boys.

International career
He represented Switzerland at youth international level.

Style of play
A tall, strong and very fast centre-back, Amenda not only dominates in the air, but also on the ground, and is renowned for his tackling ability As well as notable physical attributes, he is also very good at bringing the ball forward; whether that be dribbling into the opposition's half to create space, or picking out a long-range pass. He is also known for his coolness, even in tight situations, and exudes confidence, making him a natural leader.

Personal life
Aurèle Amenda, he was born and raised in Switzerland. He is the child of a family originally from Cameroon.

Career statistics

Club

Notes

References

External links

Auele Amenda  at SFL
Footballdatabase Profile

2003 births
Living people
Swiss people of Cameroonian descent
Swiss men's footballers
Switzerland youth international footballers
Association football defenders
Swiss 1. Liga (football) players
Swiss Promotion League players
Swiss Super League players
BSC Young Boys players
People from Biel/Bienne
Sportspeople from the canton of Bern